Air Chief Marshal Sir Alfred Earle,  (11 December 1907 – 27 March 1990) was a senior officer in the Royal Air Force during the Second World War who later served as Vice-Chief of the Defence Staff (1964–66), and Director General of British Defence Intelligence (1966–1968).

Military career
After studying at Shebbear College, Earle was commissioned into the Royal Air Force in 1925. He served in bomber squadrons in the United Kingdom and in Iraq and then became an instructor at the RAF School of Photography from 1930.

He served in the Second World War and commanded the new School of Photography in Blackpool before joining the Directorate of Photography at the Air Ministry in 1940. He transferred to the Directorate of Plans in 1941 and then formed and commanded No. 428 Squadron RCAF in 1942. He was made commander of RAF Ridgewell and RAF West Wickham in 1943 before joining the staff of General Sir Hastings Ismay for the Cairo Conference and then the Yalta Conference. In 1945 he was made Air Officer Commanding No. 300 (Transport) Group in Australia.

After the war he became Air Officer Commanding No. 232 Group in South East Asia before joining the Directing Staff at the RAF Staff College, Bracknell in 1946. He was made Senior Personnel Staff Officer at Headquarters Technical Training Command in 1949 and then Commandant of the Royal Australian Air Force Staff College in 1951.

He became Director of Policy (Air Staff) in 1954 and Air Chief of Staff (Policy) in 1955. He was Air Officer Commanding No. 13 Group from 1957 and Deputy Chief of the Defence Staff from 1960. He was made Air Officer Commanding-in-Chief at Technical Training Command in 1962 and Vice-Chief of the Defence Staff in 1964.

In 1966 Sir Alfred became the second chief of Defence Intelligence, then known as Director-General Intelligence, succeeding Sir Kenneth Strong.

Retirement
Earle retired from the RAF in 1966, before taking up the position of Director-General of Intelligence at the Ministry of Defence. From 1974 to 1976 he was the chairman of Waveney District Council.

References

|-
 

|-
 

|-
 

|-
 

Royal Air Force air marshals
Graduates of the Royal Air Force College Cranwell
1907 births
1990 deaths
Knights Grand Cross of the Order of the British Empire
Companions of the Order of the Bath
People educated at Shebbear College